Peter James Thomas is a British academic and entrepreneur.

Biography
Thomas was educated at Mexborough Grammar School, South Yorkshire, York St. John University, the University of Cambridge and the University of Hull. Following a PhD at The University of Hull in the applications of social science to computing, he lectured in Human-Computer Interaction at Brunel University, West London between 1990–1992 and became Professor of Information Management at the University of the West of England, Bristol in 1993. He is currently inaugural director of FORWARD, The Centre for Future Skills and Workforce Transformation at RMIT University in Melbourne, Australia; CEO and founding partner of THEORICA; founder and CEO of cybersecurity education platform Upling; global education strategist for the Conversation Design Institute and co-founder of the School for Conversation Design; and creative director of Medicine Unboxed. He is Editor-in-Chief of the Springer Nature research journal Personal and Ubiquitous Computing.  He was previously founding director of learning platform HaileyburyX.

Publications

Alumni of the University of Hull
Alumni of the University of Cambridge
Living people
Academics of Brunel University London
Alumni of York St John University
Year of birth missing (living people)